Safene (Saafen), Safi or Saafi-Saafi, is the principal Cangin language, spoken by 200,000 people in Senegal. Speakers are heavily concentrated in the area surrounding Dakar, particularly in the Thies Region.

Orthography
The Safen language is written in either the Arabic or the Latin script. The official orthography uses a Latin alphabet with 23 consonants and 5 vowels.

Notes

Bibliography 
 Walter Pichl, The Cangin Group - A Language Group in Northern Senegal, Pittsburgh, PA : Institute of African Affairs, Duquesne University, Coll. African Reprint Series, 1966, vol. 20
 Chérif Mbodj, Recherches sur la phonologie et la morphologie de la langue saafi. Le parler de Boukhou, Université de Nice, 1984

Languages of Senegal
Cangin languages